Joshua Taylor Adams (born November 16, 1993) is an American professional basketball player for Cedevita Olimpija of the Slovenian League and EuroCup. He played college basketball for the Wyoming Cowboys before playing professionally in Russia, Turkey, China, Australia and the NBA G League.

High school career
Adams starred at Chaparral High School where he led the Wolverines to a 5A state championship in 2012, his senior season. Adams was named MVP of the tournament. He was also named First Team All-State as well as All Colorado. His junior year, he led Chaparral to the sweet sixteen, and was named First Team All-Continental League.

College career
Adams played four seasons for the Wyoming Cowboys. In his junior season, the Cowboys won the Mountain West Conference tournament, and he was named the tournament MVP and to the all-tournament team. He was also named third team all-Mountain West Conference. In his senior season, Adams averaged 24.7 points, 5.5 rebounds and 4.2 assists per game. He led the Mountain West Conference with 94 made 3-pointers, and he set the record for single season scoring at Wyoming at 740 points. At the conclusion of the regular season, he was named Mountain West Player of the Year by the league's media, and an AP Honorable Mention All-American. Adams finished his collegiate career tied for first all time at Wyoming in games played, second in threes made, third in games started, fifth in scoring and steals, and sixth in assists.

Professional career
After going undrafted in the 2016 NBA draft, Adams signed a contract with the Denver Nuggets for their summer league team. He averaged 4.8 points, 2.3 rebounds, and 1.3 assists, in 15.2 minutes per game across 4 games. He signed to play for Russia's Avtodor Saratov of the VTB United League on July 30, 2016.

On July 12, 2017, Adams signed with Turkish club Anadolu Efes for the 2017–18 season. On January 5, 2018, he left Efes and signed with Beşiktaş for the rest of the season. On April 14, 2018, Adams recorded a season-high 22 points, shooting 10-of-12 from the field, along with three rebounds and six assists in an 87–80 win over Gaziantep Basketbol.

On August 14, 2018, Adams signed a one-year deal with the Shanxi Brave Dragons of the Chinese Basketball Association. On November 4, 2018, Adams recorded a career-high 34 points, along with six rebounds and five assists in a 101–88 loss to the Shanghai Sharks.

On January 20, 2019, Adams was claimed off of waivers by Raptors 905 of the NBA G League.

On July 19, 2019, Adams signed a one-year deal with Spanish club Unicaja. He averaged 12.9 points, 2.2 rebounds and 2.2 assists per game in ACB play. On July 20, 2020, Adams signed with Virtus Bologna of the Lega Basket Serie A. He parted ways with the team on July 9, 2021.

On July 20, 2021, Adams signed with the Tasmania JackJumpers of the National Basketball League for the 2021–22 season. Adams became the first ever import for the JackJumpers franchise and averaged 16.6 points and 3.3 rebounds per game. On July 30, 2022, he signed with Cedevita Olimpija of the Slovenian League.

Career statistics

NBA G League

|-
| style="text-align:left;"| 2018–19
| style="text-align:left;"| Raptors 905
| 20 || 11 || 29.9 || .404 || .364 || .758 || 4.3 || 4.4 || 1.1 || .6 || 15.6
|- class="sortbottom"
| style="text-align:center;" colspan="2"| Career
| 20 || 11 || 29.9 || .404 || .364 || .758 || 4.3 || 4.4 || 1.1 || .6 || 15.6

EuroLeague

|-
| style="text-align:left;"| 2017–18
| style="text-align:left;" rowspan=1| Anadolu Efes
| 16 || 8 || 16.8 || .568 || .385 || .833 || 1.6 || 2.0 || .4 || .1 || 7.0 || 6.6
|- class="sortbottom"
| style="text-align:center;" colspan="2"| Career
| 16 || 8 || 16.8 || .568 || .385 || .833 || 1.6 || 2.0 || .4 || .1 || 7.0 || 6.6

Domestic Leagues

|-
| style="text-align:center;" rowspan=1 | 2016–17
| style="text-align:left;" rowspan=1 |  Avtodor Saratov
| style="text-align:center;" rowspan=1 |VTB
| 13 || 27.4 || .476 || .344 || .739 || 2.2 || 4.2 || 1.5 || .2 || 12.1
|-
| style="text-align:center;" rowspan=2 | 2017–18
| style="text-align:left;" rowspan=1 |  Anadolu Efes
| style="text-align:center;" rowspan=2 |BSL
| 6 || 23.6 || .474 || .263 || .862 || 3.7 || 2.3 || .2 || .7 || 11.0 
|-
| style="text-align:left;" rowspan=1 |  Beşiktaş
| 18 || 30.0 || .526 || .388 || .815 || 3.0 || 4.2 || .4 || .2 || 14.1
|-
| style="text-align:center;" rowspan=1 | 2018–19
| style="text-align:left;" rowspan=1 |  Shanxi Brave Dragons
| style="text-align:center;" rowspan=1 | CBA
| 15 || 37.5 || .454 || .333 || .815 || 5.4 || 4.8 || 1.4 || .8 || 26.4
|-
| style="text-align:center;" rowspan=1 | 2019–20
| style="text-align:left;" rowspan=1 |  Unicaja
| style="text-align:center;" rowspan=1 | ACB
| 27 || 23.1 || .397 || .366 || .800 || 2.2 || 2.2 || .5 || .4 || 12.2
|-
| style="text-align:center;" rowspan=1 | 2020–21
| style="text-align:left;" rowspan=1 |  Virtus Bologna
| style="text-align:center;" rowspan=1 | LBA
| 32 || 15.8 || .378 || .327 || .870 || 1.5 || 1.3 || .7 || .2 || 6.2
|-
| style="text-align:center;" rowspan=1 | 2021–22
| style="text-align:left;" rowspan=1 |  Tasmania JackJumpers
| style="text-align:center;" rowspan=1 | NBL
| 34 || 27.7 || .410 || .339 || .789 || 3.4 || 2.0 || 1.0 || 0.2 || 17.5
|}

College

|-
| style="text-align:left;"| 2012–13
| style="text-align:left;"| Wyoming
| 34 || 26 || 28.9 || .346 || .226 || .637 || 1.4 || 1.6 || .8 || .2 || 6.6
|-
| style="text-align:left;"| 2013–14
| style="text-align:left;"| Wyoming
| 32 || 32 || 32.4 || .483 || .313 || .734 || 3.1 || 2.9 || .8 || .3 || 12.7
|- 
| style="text-align:left;"| 2014–15
| style="text-align:left;"| Wyoming
| 35 || 34 || 33.6 || .437 || .324 || .743 || 3.3 || 3.6 || 1.4 || .2 || 12.8
|-
| style="text-align:left;"| 2015–16
| style="text-align:left;"| Wyoming
| 30 || 30 || 36.9 || .441 || .378 || .827 || 5.5 || 4.2 || 1.5 || .6 || 24.7
|- class="sortbottom"
| style="text-align:center;" colspan=2| Career
| 131 || 122 || 32.8 || .434 || .330 || .760 || 3.3 || 3.0 || 1.1 || .3 || 13.9

References

External links
Wyoming Cowboys bio
EuroLeague profile
RealGM profile

1993 births
Living people
American expatriate basketball people in Australia
American expatriate basketball people in Canada
American expatriate basketball people in China
American expatriate basketball people in Russia
American expatriate basketball people in Spain
American expatriate basketball people in Turkey
American men's basketball players
Anadolu Efes S.K. players
Baloncesto Málaga players
Basketball players from Colorado
BC Avtodor Saratov players
Beşiktaş men's basketball players
Liga ACB players
Point guards
Raptors 905 players
Shanxi Loongs players
Shooting guards
Tasmania JackJumpers players
Wyoming Cowboys basketball players
United States men's national basketball team players
People from Parker, Colorado